This is a list of the extreme points and extreme elevations in Scotland.

The northernmost and westernmost points of Scotland coincide with those of the UK (both for the mainland and including the islands).

General
Northernmost point – Out Stack (Oosta), Shetland at 
Northernmost settlement – Skaw, Unst, Shetland at 
Southernmost point – Mull of Galloway, Wigtownshire at 
Southernmost settlement – Cairngaan, Wigtownshire at 
Westernmost point – Rockall (Sgeir Rocail) at 
Westernmost settlement – Caolas, Bhatarsaigh (Vatersay), Outer Hebrides at 
Easternmost point – Bound Skerry, Out Skerries, Shetland Islands at 
Easternmost settlement – Bruray, Out Skerries, Shetland Islands at

Mainland

Northernmost settlement – Skarfskerry, Caithness, Highland, Scotland at 
Southernmost point – Mull of Galloway, Wigtownshire at 
Southernmost settlement – Cairngaan, Wigtownshire at 
Westernmost point – Corrachadh Mòr, Highland at 
Westernmost settlement – Grigadale, Highland at 
Easternmost point – Keith Inch, Aberdeenshire at 
Easternmost settlement – Peterhead, Aberdeenshire at

Centre point

The centre point of Scotland is located between Blair Atholl and Dalwhinnie, Perthshire

Schiehallion, a mountain in Perthshire, is sometimes described as the centre of Scotland.

Elevation extremes

The ten tallest mountains in the UK are all found in Scotland.

Many points are on, or near sea level, but due to high rainfall, there are no natural dry pieces of land below sea level - see rivers and lochs below.

Rivers and lochs

See also
Extreme points of the British Isles
Extreme points of Ireland
John o' Groats

References

Notes

Scotland
Geography of Scotland
Lists of landforms of Scotland